Gustave Albitte (30 April 1812  – 17 November 1898 ) was a 19th-century French playwright. He was the son of the conventional Jean-Louis Albitte le Jeune and a nephew of Antoine Louis Albitte l'Aîné. 

Besides the plays he wrote in collaboration for the Parisian scenes, he also authored two novels in the style of the 1830s, where elegant young leading a "fashionable" life are experiencing a "Wertherian fever". In addition, Albitte, who also was a lawyer, published a Cours de législation gouvernementale.

Works 
Le Musicien de Valence, comédie-vaudeville in 1 act, with Antoine Simonnin, Paris, Théâtre de la Gaîté, 13 July 1834
Le Septuagénaire, ou les Deux naissances, four-act drama, with Merville, Paris, Théâtre de la Gaîté, 12 August 1834
Les Misères d'un timbalier, vaudeville in 1 act, with Lubize, Paris, Théâtre du Palais-Royal, July 1836
Spectacle à la cour, comédie-vaudeville in 2 acts, with Emmanuel Théaulon and Lubize, Paris, Théâtre du Gymnase-Dramatique, 25 November 1837
L'Ouverture de la chasse, tableau-vaudeville in 1 act, with Desvergers, Paris, Théâtre des Variétés, 9 September 1838
Deux Femmes légères, folie-vaudeville in 2 acts, with Desvergers and Maurice Alhoy, Paris, Théâtre des Folies-Dramatiques, 14 August 1839
Mon voisin d'omnibus, vaudeville in 1 act, with Louis Dugard, Paris, Théâtre du Palais-Royal, 18 July 1846
L'Avocat pédicure, comédie-vaudeville in 1 act, with Eugène Labiche and Auguste Lefranc, Paris, Théâtre du Palais-Royal, 24 April 1847
Novels
Une Vie d'homme, croquis, 1832
Un Clair de lune, rêverie, 1833
Law
Cours de législation gouvernementale, et études scientifiques sur les gouvernements de la France, depuis 1789 jusqu'à nos jours, 1835

References 

19th-century French dramatists and playwrights
Writers from Reims
1812 births
1898 deaths